Beautiful Kitty is a 1923 British silent sports film directed by Walter West and starring Violet Hopson, James Knight and Robert Vallis.

Cast

 Violet Hopson as Kitty  
 James Knight as Jim Bennett  
 Robert Vallis as Alf Briggs  
 Arthur Walcott 
 Polly Emery 
 Fred Percy

Critical reception
Allmovie called it a "drab British comedy."

References

Bibliography
 Low, Rachael. The History of the British Film 1918-1929. George Allen & Unwin, 1971.

External links
 

1923 films
1920s sports films
British horse racing films
British silent feature films
Films directed by Walter West
Films set in England
British black-and-white films
1920s English-language films
1920s British films
Silent sports films